An Enduring Love: My Life with the Shah is a book written in 2004 by Farah Pahlavi, the former Shahbanu (Empress) of Iran, who has been living in exile since the Iranian Revolution in 1979 which saw overthrow of the Pahlavi Dynasty. It is a memoir about Farah, her life before she met the Shah and how she married him and became the Queen and later Empress of Iran. The book is also about her husband, Mohammad Reza Shah Pahlavi, his personality, his family and how he reigned over the country of Iran for 37 years.

According to the interview published in The New York Times, Farah Pahlavi talked about her wedding in detail in the book. She wrote that Carita sisters created a hairstyle and Harry Winston designed a tiara for her. In addition, Shahbanu comprehensively described the years of Mohammad Reza Pahlavi's illness in exile, letters written by doctors, and the death of her daughter Leila Pahlavi. The memoir was translated into Azerbaijani by writer Nariman Abdulrahmanli.

See also 
 History of Iran

References 

2004 non-fiction books
Political autobiographies
Iranian biographies
Biographies about royalty